The Myanmar national baseball team is the national baseball team of Myanmar. The team represents Myanmar in international competitions.

Placings
Southeast Asian Games
 2005 : 4th
 2007 : 4th

National baseball teams in Asia
Baseball
Baseball in Asia